Slayden is an unincorporated community in Marshall County, Mississippi, United States. It is located along U.S. Route 72 in northeast Marshall County, about 35 miles from Memphis, TN

History
Settled in the 1860's, originally known as "Gourd Neck" then "Slayden's Crossing", historical post office 1875-1909. Named for Everett Daniel Slayden.
The population in 1900 was 26.

In 1935, Ab Young, a black tenant farmer, was lynched in Slayden by a group of 150 white men. Young had murdered a white man. The authorities took no action because they could not identify the killers.

See also
 Memphis Metropolitan Area

References

Unincorporated communities in Mississippi
Unincorporated communities in Marshall County, Mississippi